Mickey Leroy Gilley (March 9, 1936 – May 7, 2022) was an American country music singer and songwriter. Although he started out singing straight-up country and western material in the 1970s, he moved towards a more pop-friendly sound in the 1980s, bringing him further success on not just the country charts, but the pop charts as well.

Among his biggest hits are "Room Full of Roses", "Don't the Girls All Get Prettier at Closing Time", and the remake of the Soul hit "Stand by Me". Gilley charted 42 singles in the top 40 on the US Country chart. He was a cousin of Jerry Lee Lewis, Carl McVoy, and Jimmy Swaggart.

Biography

Early life and the rise to fame
Gilley was born to Arthur Fillmore Gilley (November 27, 1897 – February 2, 1982) and Irene Gilley ( Lewis; September 11, 1900 – August 14, 1985) in Natchez, Mississippi.

For many years, Gilley lived in the shadow of his well-known cousin, Jerry Lee Lewis, a successful rock and roll singer and musician in the 1950s and early 1960s. Gilley grew up in Louisiana, just across the Mississippi River from where Lewis grew up. Gilley's family moved to the east side of Houston, Texas, in the 1940s, where he attended Galena Park Highschool.  He was primarily a guitarist at the time and took his guitar to school to entertain classmates.

Gilley, Lewis, and their cousin, Jimmy Swaggart, played together as children. Lewis taught them his piano style. 

They sang both boogie-woogie and gospel music, but Gilley did not become a professional singer until Lewis hit the top of the charts in the 1950s. Gilley then cut a few singles and played sessions in New Orleans with producer Huey P. Meaux. His record "Call Me Shorty" on the Dot label sold well in 1958. In the 1960s, he played at many clubs and bars, gaining a following at the Nesadel Club in Pasadena, Texas. Paula Records released Gilley's first album, Down the Line, in 1967. He had a minor hit from the album called "Now I Can Live Again".

In 1970, Gilley joined in a partnership with Sherwood Cryer. Sherwood owned the club under the name Shelly's. His first nightclub in Pasadena, Texas, called Gilley's Club. It later became known as the "world's biggest honky-tonk". Gilley's Club and its mechanical bull were portrayed in the 1980 film, Urban Cowboy. He shared Gilley's Club with Sherwood Cryer, who asked Gilley to re-open his former bar with him. The club portion of Gilley's burned in 1990, and the rodeo arena portion was razed in 2005 to make way for a school.

Recording career in the 1970s before Urban Cowboy
In 1974, Gilley recorded a song that originally was only supposed to be recorded for fun, titled "Room Full of Roses", written by Tim Spencer of the Sons of the Pioneers, which was a one-time hit for George Morgan. The song was released by Astro Records that year, and then Playboy Records got a hold of the single and obtained national distribution for "Room Full of Roses". From then on, Gilley was signed to Playboy Records, working with his long-time friend Eddie Kilroy. "Room Full of Roses" became the song that put Gilley on national radar, hitting the very top of the Country charts that year, as well as making it to No. 50 on the pop music chart.

He had a string of top tens and No. 1s throughout the 1970s. Some of these hits were cover versions of songs, including the Bill Anderson song "City Lights", George Jones' "The Window Up Above", and Sam Cooke's "Bring It On Home to Me". He remained a popular country act for the rest of the 1970s. Other hits in the 1970s include "Chains of Love" (1977), "Honky Tonk Memories" (1977), "She's Pulling Me Back Again" (1977), and "Here Comes the Hurt Again" (1978). These songs were a mix of honky-tonk and countrypolitan that brought Gilley to the top of the charts in the 1970s.

However, a new breed of singer was entering country music. These singers were country-crossover artists that brought country success with them onto the pop charts. These singers include Glen Campbell, Crystal Gayle, Anne Murray, Olivia Newton-John, Barbara Mandrell, and Kenny Rogers. To compete with this new breed of Country singer, Gilley had to sound like them and have that kind of country-pop success that these singers were having.

In 1978, Gilley signed on with Epic Records, when Playboy Records was bought by Epic. By 1979, his success was fading slightly. Songs like "The Power of Positive Drinkin'", "Just Long Enough to Say Goodbye", and "My Silver Lining" just made the Top Ten.

Recording career in the 1980s with the success of Urban Cowboy
By 1980, Gilley decided to come up with a new sound, to bring him the country crossover success that so many other country singers (including Eddie Rabbitt, Juice Newton, Kenny Rogers, and Dolly Parton) were experiencing at the time. His career was given a second go-around when one of his recordings was featured in the box-office-selling film Urban Cowboy. The song was the country remake of the soul standard "Stand by Me". As the movie was becoming successful, so was "Stand by Me". The song rose to the top of the country charts in 1980, and hit the Top 5 of the Adult Contemporary charts, and in addition made the Pop Top 40.

"Room Full of Roses", "True Love Ways", and "You Don't Know Me" also hit the Billboard Hot 100; additionally, "Bring It On Home To Me", "That's All That Matters", and "Talk to Me" bubbled under (at 101, 101 and 106, respectively). A string of six number-ones on the country chart followed the success of Urban Cowboy. Gilley's other country No. 1s include "True Love Ways", "A Headache Tomorrow (Or a Heartache Tonight)", "You Don't Know Me", and "Lonely Nights". He never had any other pop hits though. In 1983, he had other country hits, like "Fool For Your Love"; "Paradise Tonight", a duet with Charly McClain; and "Talk to Me" (not to be confused with the Stevie Nicks hit of the same name). All of these songs from 1983 were No. 1 country hits for Gilley. In 1984, he had a single, which just missed topping the country chart called "You've Really Got a Hold on Me". Another hit followed in the form of a duet with Charly McClain, "Candy Man", and a solo hit with "Too Good To Stop Now", both of which made the Top 5 that year. 

The year 1985 brought Top 10s with "I'm the One Mama Warned You About" and "You've Got Something on Your Mind", followed by a Top 5 with "Your Memory Ain't What It Used To Be", and a Top 10 with "Doo-Wah Days" in 1986. "Doo-Wah Days" was Gilley's last Top 10 hit on the country charts, as a new breed of George Strait-inspired Country singers called the "Traditionalists" were moving into Nashville, like Clint Black, Patty Loveless, Reba McEntire, and Randy Travis. Not only was his chart success fading, but Gilley had a series of financial problems that led to the closing of his club in Pasadena, Texas.

In 1988, Gilley signed with Airborne Records and released an album, Chasin' Rainbows, which resulted in his last Top 40 country hit in "She Reminded Me of You", which made No. 23 that year.

In a career that included 15 years of chart success, Gilley had 17 No. 1 country hits.

Later career
For his contribution to the recording industry, Mickey Gilley has a star on the Hollywood Walk of Fame at 6930 Hollywood Boulevard in Los Angeles, California. He also turned his attention to Branson, Missouri, where he built a theater, which was a soon-to-be boomtown for the country music industry. 

On March 2, 2002, Gilley, along with his two famous cousins Lewis and Swaggart, was inducted into the Delta Music Museum Hall of Fame in Ferriday, Louisiana. Gilley also appeared on "Urban Cowboys", episode 9 in the third season of American Pickers, which aired originally on September 5, 2011. In 2012, Gilley signed a Branson-based vocal group, Six, to a three-year lease to perform in his theater, with an option to buy it when the contract expired.

Gilley returned to the studio in 2017 and released Kickin' It Down the Road the same year. The CD contains several new recordings and several remakes of classic songs originally recorded by him.

In 2018, Gilley teamed up with longtime friend Troy Payne to record his last studio album Two Old Cats, a CD containing 13 classic country duets.

Personal life
Gilley's first wife was Geraldine Garrett, whom he married in 1953 (when he was 17 years old); they divorced in 1961. She was the mother of three of his four children (Keith Ray, Michael, and Kathy). She died on March 6, 2010. Gilley's second wife, whom he married in 1962, was Vivian McDonald. Together they had a son, Gregory (1966 - 2022). She died in 2019. Mickey and Cindy Loeb, his longtime friend and business associate, were married in June 2020. Gilley was double first cousins with both Jerry Lee Lewis and evangelist Jimmy Swaggart of Baton Rouge, Louisiana. 

In July 2009, Gilley was helping a neighbor move some furniture when he fell with the love seat falling on top of him, crushing four vertebrae. The incident left him temporarily paralyzed from the neck down, but after intense physical therapy he was able to walk again and return to the stage a year later. However, he still lacked the hand-eye coordination necessary to play the piano.

Gilley died of complications from bone cancer. His death was announced on May 7, 2022, by Jeff Wagner, mayor of Pasadena, Texas.

Honors
In 2017, Gilley was awarded the Key to the City of Winchester, Virginia, by the Hon. David Smith at the Shenandoah Conservatory of Music's Ohrstrom-Bryant Theatre at Bonnie Blue's Roadhouse Classic Concert.

In 2020, a road in Pasadena, Texas, was renamed in his honor as Mickey Gilley Boulevard.

Other
Gilley was a licensed pilot, holding an instrument rating with commercial pilot privileges for multi-engine airplanes, as well as private pilot privileges for single engine aircraft.

The Mickey Gilley Golf Classic
The "Gilley" was first organized in 2009 by a group of urban cowboys brought together by their love for golf, country music, and rhinestone shirts. After stints in Branson, Missouri (also known as "The Town that Mickey Built") and Northwest Arkansas (moved due to legal issues), in 2014 the Gilley settled at its current location at Old Kinderhook Resort, Lake of the Ozarks, Missouri.

Discography

Awards

References

 Rhodes, Don (1998). "Mickey Gilley". In The Encyclopedia of Country Music. Paul Kingsbury, Ed. New York: Oxford University Press. p. 202.

External links
 Official Website
 Mickey Gilley at Third Coast Talent
 at the Delta Music Museum Hall of Fame
 Gilley's Early Rock and Roll Recordings
 
 

1936 births
2022 deaths
20th-century American male singers
20th-century American pianists
20th-century American singers
21st-century American male musicians
21st-century American pianists
American country pianists
American country singer-songwriters
American male pianists
American male singer-songwriters
Assemblies of God people
Charly Records artists
Epic Records artists
Playboy Records artists
Country musicians from Louisiana
Country musicians from Mississippi
Country musicians from Missouri
Countrypolitan musicians
Drinking establishment owners
Grammy Award winners
Musicians from Natchez, Mississippi
People from Branson, Missouri
People from Ferriday, Louisiana
Singer-songwriters from Louisiana
Singer-songwriters from Mississippi
Singer-songwriters from Missouri